The Outlaws is a 1930 novel by the German writer Ernst von Salomon. Its German title is Die Geächteten, which means "the ostracised". Set between 1919 and 1922, the narrative is based on Salomon's experiences from the Freikorps, and includes an account of the 1922 assassination of foreign minister Walther Rathenau, in which the then 19-year-old Salomon was peripherically involved. The Outlaws was Salomon's debut novel. It was published in English in 1931, translated by Ian F. D. Morrow.

The novel was a commercial success. It was followed by two sequels, It Cannot Be Stormed from 1932 and Die Kadetten/The Cadets from 1933.

Reception
André Levinson of Je suis partout, republished in English in The Living Age in 1932, wrote about The Outlaws: "It is sinister and obscure, an infamous epic of the last phase of the German Waterloo, the Black Terror. ... The doctrine proclaimed in Ernst von Salomon's story is a familiar one. It proclaims the preeminence of honor over justice."

References

Fiction set in 1919
Fiction set in 1920
Fiction set in 1921
Fiction set in 1922
1930 German novels
German autobiographical novels
German-language novels
Novels by Ernst von Salomon
1930 debut novels
Walther Rathenau